Clearfield Area Junior/Senior High School is a public high school located near the village of Hyde, Pennsylvania.  Clearfield Area Junior/Senior High School serves students from most of central and north central Clearfield County. The school's mascot is the bison, modeled after the American Bison. Clearfield Area High School is part of the Clearfield Area School District. In the 2018–2019 school year, the Clearfield Area High School had 1,001 pupils enrolled in grades 9th through 12th. As of the 2014-15 school season, the high school was made into a larger campus, now serving students from 7th through 12th grades.

Extracurriculars
The district offers a variety of clubs, activities and an extensive sports program.

Sports

Boys
Baseball
Basketball
Cross Country
Football
Golf
Soccer
Swimming & Diving
Tennis
Track
Wrestling

Girls
Basketball
Cheerleading
Soccer
Softball
Swimming & Diving
Tennis
Track
Volleyball

Clearfield is well known for its athletics.  Clearfield's wrestling program has a notable 41 state champions, the most of any PIAA school, with the most recent being Luke McGonigal in 2018.

Notable alumni

Howard Fargo, (class of 1946), member of the Pennsylvania House of Representatives from 1981-2000. Served as Republican Caucus Chairman 1995-2000.

References

Public high schools in Pennsylvania
Schools in Clearfield County, Pennsylvania